The Jets Flight Crew were a professional cheerleading squad for the New York Jets of the National Football League. The group was established in 2006 as the Jets Flag Crew, composed of six female flag carriers. In 2007, the group expanded and was appropriately renamed the Jets Flight Crew. The squad regularly performs choreographed routines during the team's home contests.

Denise Garvey serves as director of the squad.

The squad is currently on hiatus until 2023 for a rebrand, however the squad members are still active individually in charity events by the Jets.

History

Jets Flag Crew
The Jets Flag Crew was unveiled on October 15, 2006, during the Jets' home game against division rival Miami Dolphins. The team stressed that the crew, composed of females who relieved their male counterparts, were "flag carriers" and not cheerleaders.

Jets Flight Crew

The Jets officially announced the creation of the Jets Flight Crew on August 7, 2007. The Flag Crew had been well received the previous year, and the team felt it best to take the next step and organize an official squad that could actively participate during home games. The intention of the crew was to "enhance the overall fan experience by bringing additional energy and enthusiasm to each home game."

Denise Garvey, a former Knicks City Dancer and Cowboys cheerleader, was brought in to coordinate the squad. Given her expertise and experience in performance and dance, Garvey, with the support of the organization, held closed auditions, inviting 46 young women to try out for the squad. Of the 46, ten were chosen to become the first members of the Jets Flight Crew. The organization continued to stress that the squad was not cheerleaders but rather a unique flag carrier/dance team.

Following their inaugural season, the Flight Crew held open auditions for the first time in 2008, increasing the number of members from 10 to 22, as the squad had been well received among the fans in 2007. The Jets announced their partnership with Marc Eckō, founder of Eckō Unltd., who agreed to design the Flight Crew's 2008 uniforms.

The Flight Crew was expanded from 22 to 30 members in 2009. In 2010, the Jets, again, increased the size of the crew to as many as 40 members with Garvey noting that "We want to be the biggest presence we can be in the new stadium."

Calendar
In 2009, a Flight Crew swimsuit calendar was introduced, a testament to the squad's growing importance within the organization and in the community. The 2010 calendar featured members of the 2009 squad on beaches in New York and New Jersey while Linda W. served as the cover model. The following year, shooting for the 2011 calendar took place in Aruba.

Notable members
Gina Capelli-Mormando (2007, 2011–2013) MTV MADE Coach Season 9
Krista DeBono (2010–2014), contestant on The Amazing Race 27
Nikki Delventhal (2011–2013), contestant on The Bachelor Season 19, YouTuber
Tiffany Torres (2011–2014), contestant on The Amazing Race 27
Natalie Negrotti (2012–2014), contestant on Big Brother 18

Junior Program

Jets Junior Flight Crew
(2010–Present)
The organization introduced the Jets Junior Flight Crew in 2010, a junior program that offers children the opportunity to train with the Flight Crew while improving their "talent and abilities in a non-competitive environment."

See also

National Football League Cheerleading

References

External links
 Official Website
 Flight Crew Roster

2006 establishments in New York (state)
National Football League cheerleading squads
New York Jets
Performing groups established in 2006
Dance in New York City
Dance in New Jersey
History of women in New York (state)
History of women in New Jersey